Harry Joseph Hebner (June 15, 1891 – October 12, 1968) was an American competition swimmer and water polo player who competed at the 1908, 1912 and 1920 Summer Olympics.

As part of the American men's 4×200-meter relay teams, he won a bronze medal in 1908 and a silver medal in 1912; in 1912 he also won the 100-meter backstroke event.  In the 100-meter freestyle, he was eliminated in the semi-finals in 1908, and in the first round in 1912.  In 1920 he was a member of the fourth-place American water polo team.

Between 1910 and 1917, Hebner held all world backstroke records and won seven consecutive U.S. National backstroke titles.  In total, he won 35 national titles in various swimming events.  In 1968 he was inducted to the International Swimming Hall of Fame. In 1980, he was inducted into the USA Water Polo Hall of Fame.

He died in Michigan City, Indiana on October 12, 1968, and was buried at St. Boniface Catholic Cemetery in Chicago.

See also
 List of members of the International Swimming Hall of Fame
 List of Olympic medalists in swimming (men)
 World record progression 4 × 200 metres freestyle relay

References

External links
 

1891 births
1968 deaths
American male backstroke swimmers
American male freestyle swimmers
American male water polo players
World record setters in swimming
Medalists at the 1908 Summer Olympics
Medalists at the 1912 Summer Olympics
Olympic bronze medalists for the United States in swimming
Olympic gold medalists for the United States in swimming
Olympic silver medalists for the United States in swimming
Olympic water polo players of the United States
Water polo players from Chicago
Swimmers at the 1908 Summer Olympics
Swimmers at the 1912 Summer Olympics
Water polo players at the 1920 Summer Olympics
American water polo coaches
Swimmers from Chicago